Morehead Rural LLG is a local-level government (LLG) of Western Province, Papua New Guinea. Merauke Regency, Indonesia is located adjacently to the west. Yam, Pahoturi, and Anim languages are spoken in the LLG.

Wards
01. Bula (Kánchá language speakers)
02. Wereavere (Mblafe language speakers)
03. Wemnevere (Kémä language speakers)
04. Mibini (Namat language speakers)
05. Garaita (Nama language speakers)
06. Pongariki (Nambo language (Namna dialect) speakers)
07. Dimisisi (Idi language speakers)
08. Sibidiri (Idi language speakers)
09. Limol (Ende language speakers)
10. Keru (Neme language speakers)
11. Pukaduka
12. Kiriwo
13. Aewe
14. Wando (Warta Thuntai language speakers)
15. Kandarisa (Ránmo language speakers)
16. Rouku (Komnzo language speakers)
17. Morehead Station
18. Bimadeben (Nen speakers)
19. Eniyawa
20. Kautru
21. Kondobol (Taeme language speakers)
22. Malam (Ende language speakers)

See also
Yam languages
Pahoturi languages
Morehead River

References

Local-level governments of Western Province (Papua New Guinea)